Kandi Koated is the second studio album by American R&B recording artist Kandi Burruss, released on December 14, 2010 in the United States on her independent label Kandi Koated Entertainment and Asylum Records. The album features production from Kandi amongst others including Jazze Pha, Ne-Yo, Bryan-Michael Cox, and Drumma Boy. Kandi promoted the album with her debut EP, Fly Above EP, released on October 29, 2009. The first single "Leave U" has reached number 89 on the Billboard Hot R&B/Hip-Hop Songs chart  
The U.S. iTunes Store had a deluxe edition available for pre-order with 3 bonus tracks.

Background
In 2006, Kandi confirmed that she was working on her next album, which was originally set to be released that same year. Then, a promo single, "I Need", was released on December 19, 2006 for her second album. After the promo single failed to garner any success or attention, the album was put on hold indefinitely.

In 2008, Kandi began work on her second album. The album had several release dates in 2009; July, August, September, and November. The Fly Above EP was released on October 29, 2009, coinciding with the release of the album. It was used to promote the album and the lead single "Fly Above". Kandi made the decision to delay her second album into 2010 because she wanted to continue to record, but the main reason for the delay was because Capitol Records hadn't signed her. The deal later fell through. Kandi also wanted to be able to promote her debut EP separately from her album.

Releases and promotion
The track "Fly Above" was used as a single from her Fly Above EP.
 
Prior to the album's earliest release date, the album's intro track as well as the songs "Me & U", "I Want You", "I Just Know" (which was on her "Fly Above EP"), and "How Could You..Feel My Pain" premiered separately, one song at a time, each day starting from November 1, 2010 until November 28, 2010. The full album was later released on Kandi's website.

Kandi toured with R&B singer Eric Benét for Fantasia's Back to Me tour.

Singles
 A buzz single, "Fly Above", was released on October 6, 2009. The record was originally intended to be released as the album's lead single but was only used to support the EP Fly Above EP.
 Confirmed as the first single from the album, "Leave U" was produced by Jazze Pha. The song was released as a digital download on October 5, 2010. It was officially released to urban and rhythmic radio formats in October 2010. The song as recently debut at number 89 on the Billboards Hot R&B/Hip-Hop Songs chart.
 "Haven't Loved Right" was released as a music video on Bravotv.com
 As previewed on "The Real Housewives of Atlanta", Kandi premieres her new video for her new single, "How Could You...Feel My Pain". The video also features Kandi's well known friends, Tameka "Tiny" Cottle and rapper, Rasheeda.

Reception

Commercial performance
The album debuted at number ninety one on the US Billboard 200 chart, with first-week sales of 18,000 copies.

Critical response

Kandi Koated was well received by music critics upon its release. Allmusic writer Andy Kellman gave it 4 out of 5 stars and found Burruss to be "in fine form, either writing or co-writing each song, and she sounds more confident vocally than ever, with her material switching easily between heartache, desire, and self-empowerment". Steve Jones of USA Today gave the album 3 out of 4 stars and commented that it "proves that she's still got it as a vocal powerhouse and potent songwriter". The Ny Times review stated " her voice deserved a showcase like "Kandi Koated." The music is accomplished neo-soul, with programmed drumbeats and electronic keyboards filled out by string orchestrations and Kandi’s overdubbed vocal harmonies. It makes room for her to build narratives like an old-school soul singer."

Track listing

Notes
  denotes co-producer
 "Let's Get It" is track 9 on the track list of the deluxe edition.
 "I'm Happy", is track 14 on track list of the deluxe edition.
 "Go On Without You", a Shirley Murdock cover, is track 13 on the track list of the deluxe edition.

Charts

Weekly charts

Year-end charts

References

2010 albums
Asylum Records albums
Kandi Burruss albums
Albums produced by Jazze Pha
Albums produced by Ne-Yo
Albums produced by Malay (record producer)
Albums produced by Drumma Boy
Albums produced by Bryan-Michael Cox